Beryl Korot (born September 17, 1945) is an American video artist.

Biography
Beryl Korot has pioneered the field of video art since the early 1970s. She was co-editor of Radical Software (1970), the first publication to discuss the possibilities of the new video medium, and Video Art (1976) with Ira Schneider. Her first multiple channel works (Dachau 1974 and Text and Commentary) were seen at such diverse venues as The Kitchen (1975), Leo Castelli Gallery (1977), Documenta 6 (1977), and the Whitney Museum (1980 and 2002), Aldrich Contemporary Art Museum (2010) among others and explored the structural relationship between programming on the ancient technology of the loom and computer programming. Dachau was a four channel video work, consisting of footage taken in 1974 at the former concentration camp, Dachau. The recordings focused on the symmetry of the architecture and the present ambiance of the space, taking inspiration from the technology of the loom Korot combined her many separate elements (in this case video footage) to develop a piece of work that reflected the patterns it was formed of. Text and Commentary consisted of five video channels on five monitors showing Korot weaving on a loom. The resulting textiles are placed directly opposite from the monitors, with the viewer seated on a bench between the woven text of the textiles and the video commentary. The installation also included Korot's drawings and pictographic scores, which were the basis for both the textile production and video editing. The work explores the non-decorative meaning and numerical basis of abstract pattern, with Korot understanding the loom, with its use of punch cards, to be an early form of communication technology. Traditionally both weaving and computing have been understood as women's professions, but Korot examines both from a feminist perspective, moving beyond associations with both domesticity and femininity and placing textile art within the canon of fine art. The installation was acquired by the Museum of Modern Art.

Dachau 1974 is in the Kramlich Collection. Her painted text-based handwoven canvases in an original language were exhibited in 1986 at the John Weber Gallery and in 1990 at the Carnegie Museum (Points of Departure). Two video/music collaborations with Steve Reich (The Cave, 1993, and Three Tales, 2002) brought video installation art into a theatrical context.  Both works continue to be performed and have been installed, apart from live performances, at such venues as the Whitney Museum, the Carnegie Museum, the Reina Sofia, the Düsseldorf Kunsthalle, and ZKM. Since 2003 she has been creating a new body of video and print work which was seen at Aldrich Contemporary Art Museum for the first time, in Beryl Korot: Text/Weave/Line, Video 1977-2010, and subsequently at Dartmouth College Fall 2011 and bitforms gallery, Spring 2012, among others. She is a Guggenheim Fellow and has received numerous grants for her work from the NEA, NYSCA, and most recently from Anonymous Was a Woman (2008).

Korot has been married to composer Steve Reich since 1976. They have one son, Ezra Reich, born in 1978.

Works 
Invision, Lost Lascaux Bull, Dishes, Berlin Bees, 20 mins., 1973/4.
Dachau 1974, 4 channel video installation work, 23 mins., 1974/75.
Text and Commentary, 5 channel video installation work with 5 weavings, pictographic notations, 5 drawings, 33 mins., 1976/77.
The Cave, a video opera in 3 Acts,  music by Steve Reich, 120 mins., (1993). 
Sarai, Abram’s Wife, 3 video screen, 3 channel work, 1990.
Departure from Bikini, 2 minutes, silent, (1991)
Three Tales, a video opera, music by Steve Reich, 64 mins., 2002. 
Hindenburg, music by Steve Reich, 4 mins., 1997.
Yellow Water Taxi, 2 mins., 2003.
Vermont Landscape, 4 mins., 2004.
Pond Life, 5 mins., 2005.
Babel: the 7 minute scroll, 7 minutes, 2006 
Florence,  minutes, 2008.
Etty, 12 minutes, 2009/10.
Weaver's Notation - Variations 1 and 2, digital embroideries, 2012.

References

External links 

 Dachau 1974, pbs   
 Three Tales 
 Art 21 - Spirituality
 Art 21 - Radical Software
 Art 21 - Text and Commentary    
 Art 21 - Dachau 1974  
 Beryl Korot: "Babel: the 7 minute scroll" | Art21 "Exclusive"

1945 births
Living people
People from New York (state)
American women video artists
American video artists
American people of Romanian-Jewish descent
American people of Ukrainian-Jewish descent
Jewish American artists
21st-century American Jews
21st-century American women